1491: New Revelations of the Americas Before Columbus is a 2005 non-fiction book by American author and science writer Charles C. Mann about the pre-Columbian Americas. It was the 2006 winner of the National Academies Communication Award for best creative work that helps the public understanding of topics in science, engineering or medicine.

The book presents recent research findings in different fields that suggest human populations in the Western Hemisphere—that is, the Indigenous peoples of the Americas—were more numerous, had arrived earlier, were more sophisticated culturally, and controlled and shaped the natural landscape to a greater extent than scholars had previously thought.

The author notes that, according to these findings, two of the first six independent centers of civilization arose in the Americas: the first, Norte Chico or Caral-Supe, in present-day northern Peru; and that of Formative-era Mesoamerica in what is now southern Mexico.

Book summary
Mann develops his arguments from a variety of recent re-assessments of longstanding views about the pre-Columbian world, based on new findings in demography, climatology, epidemiology, economics, botany, genetics, image analysis, palynology, molecular biology, biochemistry, and soil science. Although there is no consensus, and Mann acknowledges controversies, he asserts that the general trend among scientists currently is to acknowledge:

 (a) population levels in the Native Americans were probably higher than traditionally believed among scientists and closer to the number estimated by "high counters." 
 (b) humans probably arrived in the Americas earlier than thought, over the course of multiple waves of migration to the New World (not solely by the Bering land bridge over a relatively short period of time).
 The level of cultural advancement and the settlement range of humans was higher and broader than previously imagined.
 The New World was not a wilderness at the time of European contact, but an environment which the Indigenous peoples had altered for thousands of years for their benefit, mostly with fire.

These three main foci (origins/population, culture, and environment) form the basis for three parts of the book.

In the introduction, Mann challenges the thesis that Native Americans "came across the Bering Strait about thirteen thousand years ago, that they lived for the most part in small, isolated groups, and that they had so little impact on their environment that even after millennia of habitation the continents remained mostly wilderness."

Part One: Numbers from Nowhere
Mann first treats New England in the 17th century. He disagrees with the popular idea that European technologies were superior to those of Native Americans, using guns as a specific example. The Native Americans considered them little more than "noisemakers", and concluded they were more difficult to aim than arrows. Prominent colonist John Smith of the southern Jamestown colony noted as an "awful truth" that a gun "could not shoot as far as an arrow could fly". Moccasins were more comfortable and sturdy than the boots Europeans wore, and were preferred by most during that era because their padding offered a more silent approach to warfare. The Indian canoes could be paddled faster and were more maneuverable than any small European boats.

Mann explores the fall of the Inca Empire and attempts to assess their population compared to the armies of conquistadors, such as Francisco Pizarro. He discusses the fatal importance of the numerous newly introduced infectious diseases, and the likelihood that these played a far more significant role in the Native American decline than did warfare or other actions by Europeans. He notes that while Europeans probably derived less benefit than expected from their use of horses, as e.g. the stepped roads of Inca settlements were impassable to horses, the Inca did not maximize their use of anti-horse inventions to stop the Spanish intruders. The Inca Empire collapsed because by the time Europeans arrived in force, smallpox and other epidemics had already swept through cities and caused high mortality, due mostly to the natives' lack of immunity to new Eurasian diseases.

The contrasting approaches of "High Counters" and "Low Counters" among historians are discussed. Among the former, anthropologist Henry F. Dobyns estimated the number of pre-Columbian Native Americans as close to 100 million, while critics of the High Counters include David Henige, who wrote Numbers from Nowhere (1998).

Part Two: Very Old Bones
Mann discusses the provenance and dating of human remains, which may provide evidence of the period of first settlement of the Americas. The Clovis culture in New Mexico was one of the first to be assessed using carbon dating. While at first it was believed to have originated between 13,500 and 12,900 years ago, following immigration of peoples from Siberia over the Bering land bridge, recent evidence indicates that Paleo-Indians were present in the Americas at even earlier dates.
 
Agriculture is another focus of this section; Mann explores Andean and Mesoamerican cultures. The agricultural development of maize from essentially inedible precursors such as teosinte was significant because it enabled the production of crop surpluses, growing populations and complex cultures, and was pivotal to the rise of civilizations such as the Olmec. Mann notes that Mesoamericans did not have the luxury of "stealing" or adopting inventions from others, since they were geographically isolated in comparison to the cultures of Eurasia. There a large, relatively open landmass had resulted in extensive trading and warfare, both of which dispersed cultural inventions. In the Americas, cultures were somewhat more isolated. They did not invent the wheel and mostly lacked domesticated large animals.

Part Three: Landscape With Figures
In the third section, Mann attempts a synthesis.  He focuses on the Maya, whose population growth appears to have been as rapid as its decline. The canonical theory about the disappearance of Mayan civilization, a pattern common among many Native American cultures, was stated by Sylvanus Morley as: 
"the Maya collapsed because they overshot the carrying capacity of their environment. They exhausted their resource base, began to die of starvation and thirst, and fled their cities 'en masse', leaving them as silent warnings of the perils of ecological hubris."

Mann discusses the growing evidence that shows Native Americans did transform their lands. Most Native Americans shaped their environment with fire, using slash-and-burn techniques to create grasslands for cultivation and to encourage the abundance of game animals. Native Americans domesticated fewer animals and cultivated plant life differently from their European counterparts, but did so quite intensively. Ancient cultures in South America have been found to have constructed elaborate irrigation systems and terraced steep mountains to produce crops and defensively protected settlements.

The author suggests that Europeans' limited and often racist views about the indigenous peoples, in addition to lack of a common language among the indigenous peoples, often resulted in a failure by Europeans to recognize how Native Americans managed their lands. Some historians drew conclusions such as the "law of environmental limitation of culture" (Betty J. Meggers); that is, Native Americans practices before slash and burn worked because vast expanses of healthy forest appeared to have existed before Europeans arrived.

Mann argues that, in fact, Native Americans were a keystone species, one that "affects the survival and abundance of many other species". By the time the Europeans arrived in number to supplant the indigenous population in the Americas, the previous dominant people had been almost eliminated, mostly by disease. There was extensive disruption of societies and loss of environmental control as a result. Decreased environmental influence and resource competition would have led to population explosions in species such as the American bison and the passenger pigeon. Because fire clearing had ceased, forests would have expanded and become denser. The world discovered by Christopher Columbus began to change after his arrival, so Columbus "was also one of the last to see it in pure form".

Mann concludes that we must look to the past to write the future. "Native Americans ran the continent as they saw fit. Modern nations must do the same. If they want to return as much of the landscape as possible to its state in 1491, they will have to create the world's largest gardens."

Reception
A 2005 The New York Times book review stated that the book's approach is "in the best scientific tradition, carefully sifting the evidence, never jumping to hasty conclusions, giving everyone a fair hearing -- the experts and the amateurs, the accounts of the Indians and of their conquerors. And rarely is he less than enthralling."

Editions
 1491: New Revelations of the Americas Before Columbus. Knopf, 2005 .
Ancient Americans: Rewriting the History of the New World. First UK edition. Published by Granta Books in 2005. 
 1491: The Americas Before Columbus.  European edition. Published in Europe by Granta Books on 6 November 2006.
 1491: New Revelations of the Americas Before Columbus. Second edition. Vintage, 2011 
 1491: Una nueva historia de las Américas antes de Colón (Spanish-language edition). Seven Stories Press, 2013.

Sequel
In 2011, Mann published his sequel, 1493: Uncovering the New World Columbus Created. It explores the results of the European colonization of the Americas, a topic begun in Alfred Crosby's 1972 work The Columbian Exchange, which examined exchanges of plants, animals, diseases and technologies after European encounter with the Americas. Mann added much new scholarship that had been developed in the 40 years since that book was published.

Adaptation
In 2017, an eight-episode documentary miniseries titled 1491: The Untold Story of the Americas Before Columbus was released by Animiki See Digital Production, Inc. and Arrow Productions.

See also
 Archaeology of the Americas
 Beni savanna
 Columbian Exchange
 European colonization of the Americas
 Forest gardening
 Indian massacres
 Megafauna
 Population history of American indigenous peoples
 Quaternary extinction event
 Terra preta, anthropogenic soil found in the Amazon Basin

 Books
 Before the Revolution: America's Ancient Pasts by Daniel K. Richter
 Indian Givers: How the Indians of the Americas Transformed the World
 Nomads of the Longbow
 Dark Emu: Black Seeds: Agriculture or Accident?

References

Further reading
 Charles Mann, "1491", from The Atlantic Monthly, March 2002. Original article that inspired the book.
 "An interview with Charles C. Mann" (Part 1, Part 2), from Indian Country Today December 20, 2005.
 "A Conversation with Charles C. Mann", by Bookbrowse.com
 Paper challenges 1491 Amazonian population theories, Argues, contra Mann, that the activities of pre-Columbian Amazonians did not reshape or "build up" the Amazon into its current state. Accessed August 18, 2008.

Reviews
 Michael Coe, "The Old New World", American Scientist, July–August 2006 issue.
 Mary D'Ambrosio, "The myth of an empty frontier: Explorers' diseases wiped out native populations long before settlers arrived", San Francisco Chronicle, August 14, 2005.
 Alan Taylor, "A Cultivated World", The Washington Post, August 7, 2005; BW05
 Bruce Ramsey, ""1491": Discovering what Americas were like before Columbus", The Seattle Times, August 12, 2005

2005 non-fiction books
2005 in the environment
21st-century history books
Environmental non-fiction books
History books about the Americas
History of indigenous peoples of the Americas
Indigenous peoples and the environment
Mesoamerican studies books
Non-fiction books about indigenous peoples of the Americas
Pre-Columbian studies books